The 2008 Indy Racing League Firestone Indy Lights Series season, formerly the Indy Pro Series, began on March 29, 2008, and consisted of 16 races.  Due to the discontinuation of the United States Grand Prix at the Indianapolis Motor Speedway, the series lost its Liberty Challenge double header typically held that weekend. The Liberty double header were replaced by the addition of a second race at the Mid-Ohio Sports Car Course and a return to the Kansas Speedway, where the series had not raced since 2004. All races were shown time-delayed on ESPN2. Live stream video was available on the IndyCar Lights Series website. It was announced on March 22, 2008, that Firestone signed on to be the title sponsor of the Indy Pro Series, and thus the series was retitled the Firestone Indy Lights, in reference to the old Indy Lights development series which ran under CART from 1986 to 2001.

Drivers and teams

All teams compete in Firestone-shod Dallaras.

Race schedule

Race summaries

Miami 100
Saturday March 29, 2008
Homestead-Miami Speedway, Homestead, Florida
Race weather: 82 °F, fair skies
Pole position winner: #27 Raphael Matos 57.2075 sec (2 laps) 186.899 mph (300.785 km/h)
Race Summary: As opposed to the previous year's race which was repeatedly slowed by major incidents, the 2008 season opener ran free of any major incidents. Polesitter Raphael Matos was passed in the opening laps by a hard-charging Richard Antinucci who started fifth. Antinucci dominated the middle portion of the race, but when he started to reach lapped traffic, rookie Dillon Battistini was able to catch him and the two battled for the remainder of the race. Following a caution flag with less than 10 laps to go, Battistini was able to find his way around Antinucci to take his first series win in his first race, which was also his first race on an oval track. The 23 cars running at the finish is a series record.

St. Pete 100 Race 1
Saturday April 5, 2008
Streets of St. Petersburg, St. Petersburg, Florida
Race weather: 84 °F, fair skies
Pole position winner: #27 Raphael Matos 1:06.4669 sec, 97.492 mph (156.898 km/h)
Race Summary: Raphael Matos dominated the race and captured his third win at St. Pete in 3 races. The race was slowed 3 times early in the race by caution flags caused by two spins by Bobby Wilson and Mitchell Cunningham going off course, but the final 26 laps were run without a full-course caution. Matos drew the number four following the race, meaning that the top four positions would be inverted and Jeff Simmons would start race 2 from the pole.

St. Pete 100 Race 2
Sunday April 6, 2008
Streets of St. Petersburg, St. Petersburg, Florida
Race weather: 79 °F, overcast
Pole position winner: #2 Jeff Simmons (4th place in race 1)
Race Summary: Jeff Simmons led the first half of the race from the pole, which was slowed many times by caution flags. On a restart on lap 25, the fastest car on the track Raphael Matos tried to pass Simmons, but the two banged wheels and Ana Beatriz passed both of them and took the lead. Simmons would eventually retire from the race due to the damage incurred and Matos had to pit to replace a flattened tire. Beatriz would lead until a restart on lap 30 when she and her teammate came together in the middle of turn 1. Beatriz spun and attempted to rejoin the race right in front of the car of Pablo Donoso. The two made heavy contact and were out of the race. Antinucci continued on to the victory. He was later penalized 10 points for making avoidable contact with Beatriz.

Kansas Lottery 100
Sunday April 27, 2008
Kansas Speedway, Kansas City, Kansas
Race weather: 56 °F, sunny
Pole position winner: #7 Richard Antinucci (entrant points)
Race Summary: Qualifying was scheduled for the morning of the race but low temperatures caused it to be canceled and the field lined up based on entrant points, giving points leader Richard Antinucci the pole.

Antinucci was passed shortly after the start by a gaggle of cars including Dillon Battistini, Arie Luyendyk Jr., Raphael Matos, and J. R. Hildebrand.  Hildebrand took the lead from Battistini on lap 20.  On lap 56 Raphael Matos who was running in 6th made contact with Jeff Simmons and shot into the wall, knocking him out of the race and dropping him from second to fourth in points.  Hildebrand was able to hold off a hard-charging Robbie Pecorari who started 23rd because he competed for a part-time team to capture his first Indy Lights victory in just his second race on an oval. Hildebrand also took the points lead by two points over Antinucci.

Firestone Freedom 100
Friday May 23, 2008
Indianapolis Motor Speedway, Speedway, Indiana
Race weather: 
Pole position winner: #15 Dillon Battistini 188.397 mph (303.196 km/h)
Race Summary: Dillon Battistini led at the start and was consistently hounded by the cars of James Davison and Wade Cunningham throughout the race. The most spectacular moment of the race came when Davison and J. R. Hildebrand's cars came together on the backstretch, forcing nearby cars to go four-wide and Jeff Simmons to drop two tires into the grass to avoid the slowing pair of cars that sustained slight damage. During the final ten laps of the race, Richard Antinucci was able to catch a draft behind Battistini, but reported that when he pulled out of the draft to pass, he was unable to maintain enough speed to complete the maneuver and Battistini was able to cruise to his second win of the season.

Milwaukee 100
Sunday June 1, 2008
Milwaukee Mile, West Allis, Wisconsin
Race weather: , sunny
Pole position winner: #22 Pablo Donoso 145.699 mph (234.480 km/h)
Race Summary: Pablo Donoso captured the first pole of his Indy Lights career. The race was slowed three times early on by incidents resulting in light contact with the wall by Ana Beatriz and Marc Williams and heavy contact by Mark Olson. After the third caution ended on lap 29 the race went green for the final 71 laps. Bobby Wilson, who took the lead from Donoso on lap 13 drove away from the field and, although challenged late by Jeff Simmons, held on for his third series victory. The win was the first for his team (Team E) and Wilson's first of the season and first on an oval.

Jeld-Wen 100
Saturday June 21, 2008
Iowa Speedway, Newton, Iowa
Race weather: , Mostly Cloudy
Pole position winner: #26 Arie Luyendyk Jr. 160.397 mph (258.134 km/h)
Race Summary: The cars of Arie Luyendyk Jr. and Dillon Battistini dominated the race, with Luyendyk leading the first 101 laps from the pole and building an approximate 0.5 second lead on Battistini who built a several second lead on the rest of the field. On lap 102 Luyendyk came up on the nearly lap-down cars of Robbie Pecorari and James Davison running side by side and had to lift off the throttle to avoid, running over them. This allowed Battistini to squeeze by the slowed car of Luyendyk. Shortly thereafter on lap 106 Jonny Reid spun coming out of turn four and made moderate contact with the outside wall in what was the largest incident of the day. After cleanup, the green flag waved with one lap to go but Battistini was able to hold off Luyendyk, capturing his third win of the season and denying Luyendyk his first series win in 53 starts. Battistini also captured the points lead over prior leader Richard Antinucci who struggled to a 9th-place finish.

Corning Duels Race 1
Saturday July 5, 2008
Watkins Glen International, Watkins Glen, New York
Race weather: 72°, Sunny
Pole position winner: #55 Franck Perera 1:37.8651 sec, 
Race summary: The race started under caution as James Davison stalled on track and Matt Lee spun during the pace laps. Once the green flag flew, Raphael Matos and Richard Antinucci passed polesitter Franck Perera in turn 4. Later that lap, Perera spun in the "toe" of the "boot" while J. R. Hildebrand and Bobby Wilson spun in the very next corner. The race was slowed one more time by a solo spin by points leader Dillon Battistini who had struggled all weekend. Matos dominated the remaining laps and won the race by over 2 seconds in front of his closest pursuer Antinucci. The race was ended 1 lap prior to the scheduled length because of the series imposed 1 hour time limit.

Corning Duels Race 2
Saturday July 5, 2008
Watkins Glen International, Watkins Glen, New York
Race weather: 76°, Sunny
Pole position winner: #23 Logan Gomez (6th place in race 1)
Race summary: The number six was drawn meaning that the top 6 positions from the first race would be inverted for race two and Logan Gomez would start from the pole. Ana Beatriz who started third took the lead from Gomez on lap 1 as Jonny Reid crashed, bringing out an early caution. After the restart Richard Antinucci climbed through the field to pass his teammate Beatriz for the lead on lap 10. Raphael Matos eventually found his way around Beatriz and began closing on Antinucci in the lead. Cyndie Allemann made heavy contact bringing out a full course caution and eliminating Antinucci's lead. However, Antinucci had a tremendous restart and was able to build his lead back to over 1 second and capture his second win of the season and regain the points lead.

Sunbelt Rentals 100
Saturday July 12, 2008
Nashville Superspeedway, Lebanon, Tennessee
Race weather: , Mostly Cloudy
Pole position winner: #11 James Davison 51.8844 sec 180.401 mph (290.327 km/h) 2 lap average
Race summary: The race was delayed approximately 90 minutes by rain. At the start, Raphael Matos spun, but his car was not damaged and he was able to continue the race from the back of the field. On lap 32 Ana Beatriz passed teammate polesitter James Davison to take the lead. On lap 45 Jonny Reid and Davison made contact with Reid's car nearly getting airborne, however both drivers were uninjured. On the restart Beatriz was able to pull away from second place Bobby Wilson to capture her first Indy Lights series win, the first by a female driver.

Mid-Ohio 100 Race 1
Saturday July 19, 2008
Mid-Ohio Sports Car Course, Lexington, Ohio
Race weather: 
Pole position winner: #27 Raphael Matos 1:13.1434 sec, 111.135 mph (178.854 km/h)
Race summary: Raphael Matos drove away from the field as he assumed the points lead and Dillon Battistini's bad luck continued. Matos led every lap of the race that was not slowed by any caution flags. The most significant incident occurred during the first lap when Wade Cunningham and Daniel Herrington made contact but were able to continue after dropping back, although Herrington's car required serious repair. Cunningham would recover to finish 12th while Herrington finished 21st after repairs. Another incident involved Battistini spinning off after light contact with Logan Gomez. He would finish 18th. Matos continued to stretch his lead over Perera late into the race and was essentially unchallenged for his third win of the year while Perera scored his first series podium finish.

Mid-Ohio 100 Race 2
Sunday July 20, 2008
Mid-Ohio Sports Car Course, Lexington, Ohio
Race weather: Rain
Pole position winner: #9 Jonny Reid (4th place in Race 1)
Race summary: The race was delayed because of heavy downpours causing standing water on the track. As a result of the delay, the race's time limit was shortened to 40 minutes from the usual 60. Virtually every driver in the field spun at least once and 10 of the 20 laps run were run under caution. Polesitter Jonny Reid led the first 16 laps until he was passed by Mitch Cunningham as the track finally started to dry. However, two laps later, Cunningham spun, handing the lead back to Reid. On the final lap of the race, Richard Antinucci, Robbie Pecorari, and Logan Gomez tangled, bringing out yet another full course caution and the race was to end under yellow with Reid all but assured his first series victory. However, Reid pulled into the pits, following the pace car as he thought the race was over, handing the win to James Davison, which was his first in the series. Points leader Raphael Matos had crashed early in the race and finished 18th. Reid was credited with 9th place.

Kentucky 100
Sunday August 9, 2008
Kentucky Speedway, Sparta, Kentucky
Race weather: Partly cloudy
Pole position winner: #27 Raphael Matos 55.9064 sec 190.604 mph (2 lap average)
Race summary: Dillon Battistini, who started 4th, took the lead from Ana Beatriz on lap 2 and led the rest of the way for his fourth win of the season. 20 of the race's final 29 laps were run under caution due to three separate incidents that took out Jeff Simmons, Pablo Donoso, Christina Orr and C. R. Crews.

Carneros 100
Saturday August 23, 2008
Infineon Raceway, Sonoma, California
Race weather: Sunny
Pole position winner: #55 Franck Perera 1:23.2851 sec, 99.547 mph (160.205 km/h)
Race summary: Polesitter Franck Perera led every lap to capture his first Indy Lights victory and Guthrie Racing's first win of the season. Richard Antinucci had passed outside front row starter Raphael Matos, his closest pursuer in the championship, at the start of the race for the second position, but was penalized and put back behind Matos. Matos took the points lead by a single point on points earned from this race.

Valley of the Moon 100
Sunday August 24, 2008
Infineon Raceway, Sonoma, California
Race weather: Sunny
Pole position winner: #22 Pablo Donoso (8th place in first race)
Race summary: Due to a random draw, the first eight finishing positions from the Carneros 100 were used to determine the starting lineup for the Valley of the Moon 100, putting Pablo Donoso on the pole and Richard Antinucci, Raphael Matos, and Franck Perera in 6th, 7th, and 8th respectively. On the first lap, Mitch Cunningham made contact with another car and ran off track with his car coming to rest upside down and Logan Gomez was able to find his way from fourth to second. After the restart, Donoso was able to pull away from Gomez and led every lap as the race was not again slowed by caution. On lap 27, Matos had a run on Antinucci coming into turn 10, however, Antinucci slammed the door and Matos was forced to dive off track to avoid contact. Coming into turn 11, as both were under pressure from Perera who had gained on them after the theatrics in the previous turn, Matos bumped Antinucci from behind, sending him wide while both drivers were passed by Perera. The incident is under review by race officials. Donoso's win is his as well as his team's first in the series and he becomes the record 9th different driver to win in a single season.

SunRichGourmet.com 100
Sunday September 7, 2008
Chicagoland Speedway, Joliet, Illinois
Race weather: Sunny
Pole position winner: #27 Raphael Matos
Race summary: The Team AGR-AFS Racing cars of Raphael Matos and Arie Luyendyk Jr. led 1-2 throughout the race, quickly followed by Ana Beatriz and Bobby Wilson who battled for third. A pivotal crash involving Richard Antinucci and Sean Guthrie on lap 26 sealed the 2008 Series Championship for Rafael Matos when Antinucci was unable to continue. Matos led his teammate entering the final lap. Luyendyk challenged and both Luyendyk and Beatriz passed Matos. Beatriz challenged for the lead but was unable to pass Luyendyk at the wire. Luyendyk won his first race after 62 starts in the series.

Driver standings

 Ties in points broken by number of wins, or best finishes.

See also
2008 IndyCar Series season
2008 Champ Car Atlantic Season

References

External links
Indy Lights Series website

Indy Lights seasons
Indy Lights
Indy Lights